A British Business Group (BBG) is an association or club of expatriate British business people. The aims of the group are typically to encourage trade with the host country and to provide a social environment for business networking. Typically a BBG will organize trade missions, lectures and social functions. Many BBGs fulfill a charitable role, although that is not a primary function.

BBGs are often closely associated with the local British consulate or embassy, and with related organizations, such as the Middle East Association or the UKTI.

List of Typical British Business Groups 
 United States 
 Abu Dhabi
 Bangladesh
 Dubai & Northern Emirates
 Greece, British and Commonwealth Business and Professional Group of Thessaloniki
 Jeddah, Saudi Arabia
 Libya
 Macedonia
 Chennai, India
 Vietnam 
 Oman
 Bahrain
 Tanzania
 Goa, India
 Gujarat, India
 Pune, India
 Azerbaijan
 Bangalore, India

Notes and references

International business
Business organisations based in the United Kingdom